Protancylis is a genus of moths belonging to the subfamily Olethreutinae of the family Tortricidae.

Species
Protancylis amseli Diakonoff, 1983
Protancylis bisecta Razowski, 2002

See also
List of Tortricidae genera

References

External links
tortricidae.com

Enarmoniini
Tortricidae genera
Taxa named by Alexey Diakonoff